The 2016 Karshi Challenger was a professional tennis tournament played on hard courts. It was the tenth edition of the tournament which was part of the 2016 ATP Challenger Tour. It took place in Qarshi, Uzbekistan between 2 and 7 May 2016.

Singles main-draw entrants

Seeds

 1 Rankings as of April 25, 2016.

Other entrants
The following players received wildcards into the singles main draw:
  Pavel Tsoy
  Sanjar Fayziev
  Temur Ismailov
  Shonigmatjon Shofayziyev

The following players received entry from the qualifying draw:
  Sergey Betov
  Denis Matsukevich
  Francesco Vilardo
  Richard Muzaev

The following player received entry as a lucky loser:
  Sam Barry

Champions

Singles

  Marko Tepavac def.  Dudi Sela, 2–6, 6–3, 7–6(7–4)

Doubles

  Enrique López Pérez /  Jeevan Nedunchezhiyan def.  Aleksandre Metreveli /  Dmitry Popko, 6–1, 6–4

External links
Official Website

Karshi Challenger
Karshi Challenger